"I Want It All" was the lead single released from Warren G's third album of the same name. The song, which featured Mack 10, was Warren's sixth and final top-40 single and was also his fourth and final single to reach at least gold status, being certified gold by the RIAA on November 17, 1999. "I Want It All" was also his second single to reach #1 on the Rap charts, the first being "Regulate". A remix was also released that featured rappers, Drag-On and Memphis Bleek. This song contains a sample of "I Like It" by DeBarge.

Single track listing

A-Side
"I Want It All" (Radio Edit)- 4:17
"I Want It All" (Album Version)- 4:44

B-Side
"I Want It All" (Instrumental)- 4:23
"I Want It All" (Clean Acapella)- 4:21

Charts

Weekly charts

Certifications

Notes 

1999 singles
1999 songs
Warren G songs
Mack 10 songs
Songs written by Warren G
Songs written by Mack 10
Music videos directed by Paul Hunter (director)